Eagle Mountain Lake is a reservoir in North Texas, formed by the damming the West Fork of the Trinity River. The reservoir sits below Lake Bridgeport reservoir and above Lake Worth reservoir.

History
The Texas State Board of Water Engineers granted a permit for constructing the dam that would form Eagle Mountain Lake on May 1, 1928. Construction of the dam that formed the reservoir began on January 23, 1930 and was completed on October 24, 1932. Water impoundment began on February 28, 1934. During World War II, the lake's eastern shore was the site of Marine Corps Air Station Eagle Mountain Lake, a military installation built to house the military's glider program. In 1965, the Tarrant Regional Water District voters approved a bond issue to allow the District to install improved controlled spillways. The new spillway was completed July 31, 1971. On May 24, 2011, an EF0 tornado formed over Eagle Mountain Lake, causing damage along west of Boat Club Road downing some trees and damaging mobile homes.

Recreation
Eagle Mountain Lake is used for boating, fishing and water sports such as sailing, wake boarding, water skiing, and kayaking. The reservoir area also has picnic areas, walking trails, campgrounds, and restaurants.

See also 
 Tarrant Regional Water District
Trinity River (Texas)

References 

Volumetric Survey of Eagle Mountain Lake
Texas State Historical Association - Eagle Mountain Reservoir
Texas Water Development Board - Eagle Mountain Dam and Lake

External links 
 Eagle Mountain Lake
 

Reservoirs in Texas
Trinity River (Texas)
Bodies of water of Tarrant County, Texas
Bodies of water of Wise County, Texas
Protected areas of Tarrant County, Texas
Protected areas of Wise County, Texas